The Bibasis (Greek: βίβασις) was a common dance at ancient Sparta, which was much practised both by men and women.

History 
The Bibasis, a dance of men and women, was of the gymnastic kind. The dance consisted in springing rapidly from the ground, and striking the feet behind; a feat of which the Spartan woman Lampito, in the Lysistrata of Aristophanes, prides herself. She derives her strength and her beauty essentially from this exercise.

The dance consisted in kicking one's own buttocks, to music, as rapidly as possible. The number of successful strokes was counted, and the most skilful received prizes in competitions. We are told by a verse from an epigram, which has been preserved by Pollux, that a Laconian girl had won by dancing the Bibasis a thousand times, which was more than had ever been done before.

References

Notes

Sources 

 Lawler, Lillian B. (1964). The Dance in Ancient Greece. Middletown, CT: Wesleyan University Press. p. 121.
 Müller, C. O. (1830). The History and Antiquities of the Doric Race. Vol. 2. Tufnell, Henry, and Lewis, George Cornewall (trans.). Oxford: S. Collingwood. pp. 351–352.
 Raftis, Alkis, ed. "βίβασις, bibasis, vivasis". Encyclopedia of Ancient Greek Dance. International Dance Council CID. Accessed 10 July 2022. 
 Reisch, Emil (1896). "Bibasis (2)". In Wissowa, Georg (ed.). Paulys Realencyclopädie der classischen Altertumswissenschaft. Vol. 3: Barbarus–Campanus. Stuttgart: Metzler. pp. 390–391. 
 Roebuck, Mary C., and Roebuck, Carl A. (April–June 1955). "A Prize Aryballos". Hesperia: The Journal of the American School of Classical Studies at Athens, 24(2): pp. 158–163. 
 Rogers, Benjamin Bickley (1946). Aristophanes III. London: William Heinemann Ltd.; Cambridge, MA: Harvard University Press. p. 13.
 Sider, David (December 2021). "Pyrwias Leading the Dance". Antichistica, 31. Edizioni Ca’Foscari. pp. 115–129.
 Smith, William (1890). "Saltatio". In Smith, William; Wayte, William; Marindin, G. E. (eds.). A Dictionary of Greek and Roman Antiquities. 3rd ed. London: John Murray. p. 594. 
 Snodgrass, Mary Ellen (2016). The Encyclopedia of World Folk Dance. Lanham, MD: Rowman & Littlefield. pp. 112, 119.
 Threatte, Leslie (1967). "An Interpretation of a Sixth-Century Corinthian Dipinto". Glotta, 45(3/4): pp. 186–194. 
 "Two-handled storage jar (pelike) depicting young athletes jumping". Museum of Fine Arts, Boston. Accessed 10 July 2022.

Ancient Greek dances